The 1997 IFMAR 1:10 Electric Off-Road World Championship was the 7th edition of the biennial IFMAR 1:10 Electric Off-Road World Championship for 1:10 scale radio-controlled electric off-road buggies sanctioned by the International Federation of Model Auto Racing (IFMAR) to be run over two classes (2WD and 4WD) over seven days between 9 and 16 August 1997 with each class ran for three days. 

The national sanctional body was the Remotely Operated Auto Racers (ROAR) the IFMAR member for North America.

Circuit 
The track is made of hardpack and own it origins to the RC Car shop that it was linked to in the 1970s. It is presently under the control of Losi and Gil Losi Sr. whose son is a former World Champion was key to the event happening.

Results

2WD

4WD

Reference

IFMAR 1:10 Electric Off-Road World Championship